Iain William Provan (born 6 May 1957) is a British Old Testament scholar, now living in Canada. He is Marshall Sheppard Professor of Biblical Studies at Regent College.

Education 
Provan holds degrees from the University of Glasgow, London Bible College (now London School of Theology), and the University of Cambridge.  His PhD thesis at Cambridge was published in 1988 as Hezekiah and the Books of Kings (BZAW 172; Berlin: De Gruyter).  He previously lectured at King's College London and then, after holding a postdoctoral fellowship at the University of Wales, at the University of Edinburgh.

Career 
Provan has written numerous academic essays, many of the earlier of which are included in his Against the Grain: Selected Essays (ed. Stacey L. Van Dyk; Vancouver: Regent Publishing, 2015).  He has also published commentaries on Lamentations, 1 and 2 Kings, Ecclesiastes, and the Song of Songs, as well as co-editing (with Mark Boda) Let Us Go Up To Zion (VTSup 153; Leiden: Brill, 2012), a Festschrift for his Cambridge PhD supervisor, Hugh G. M. Williamson.  His other books include Convenient Myths: The Axial Age, Dark Green Religion, and the World That Never Was (Waco: Baylor University Press, 2013), Discovering Genesis: Content, Interpretation, Reception (London: SPCK, 2015), The Reformation and the Right Reading of Scripture (Waco, TX: Baylor University Press, 2017), and Seeking What is Right: The Old Testament and the Good Life (Waco: Baylor University Press, 2020). The 2003 co-authored volume A Biblical History of Israel (with V. Philips Long and Tremper Longman III) was the winner of the 2005 Biblical Archaeology Society prize for the best popular book on archaeology; it has now appeared in a second edition (Louisville: Westminster John Knox, 2015). Seriously Dangerous Religion: What the Old Testament Really Says, and Why It Matters (Waco: Baylor University Press, 2014) won the 2016 R. B. Y. Scott Award from the Canadian Society of Biblical Studies, recognizing an outstanding book in the areas of Hebrew Bible and/or the Ancient Near East.  

Provan has been awarded an Alexander von Humboldt Foundation Research Fellowship on four occasions, and (once) a Lilly Foundation Theological Research Grant.  He was a visiting fellow at Clare Hall, Cambridge, in 1993, and has been a Life Member of the college since that time.  He is a member of the Society for Old Testament Study, the Society of Biblical Literature, the Canadian Society of Biblical Studies, and the Humboldt Association of Canada.  He is also a minister of the Church of Scotland.  He is married with four adult children.  His hobbies include fly-fishing.

Works

Thesis

Books

Chapters

For a full list of all book chapters and journal articles, go to iainprovan.ca.

References

Living people
1957 births
British biblical scholars
Old Testament scholars
Alumni of the University of Glasgow
Alumni of the London School of Theology
Alumni of Clare Hall, Cambridge
Academics of the University of Edinburgh
Academics of King's College London
Bible commentators
20th-century Ministers of the Church of Scotland
Academic staff of Regent College